Eva L. Baker is a Distinguished Professor currently at the University of California, Los Angeles, the former acting dean of the Graduate School of Education & Information Studies and current Director of the National Center for Research on Evaluation, Standards, and Student Testing (CRESST).

Education
Baker enrolled at the University of California, Los Angeles at 18 years old and subsequently completed her B.A., M.A., and Ed.D. degrees at the university.  Soon thereafter, she accepted an assistant professor position.

Research

National
She has conducted studies of technology, teaching, learning, and assessment in history, science, workforce readiness, and writing.  She has studied the uses of technology, instruction, and performance assessment in large-scale environments for both military and public education and has conducted research for, or advised, the U.S. Congress, the Departments of Education, Labor, Energy, and Defense, private foundations, numerous state departments of education, local school districts, and private corporations.

International
Baker has conducted studies of performance standards and national assessment policies for the Organisation for Economic Co-Operation and Development (OECD), the Asia-Pacific Economic Cooperation (APEC) Education Forum Project, and the Asia-Pacific Educational Research Association.  She has been an advisor to ministries and universities in Latin America, the Middle East, Australia, Europe, and Asia, and to other international organizations such as NATO.

Accomplishments

In 2007, she served as the American Educational Research Association President, a member of the U.S. Department of Education Advisory Council on Education Statistics, the Independent Review Panel on Title I, and was the measurement expert in the federal process of rule making for educational policy, and as a member of the National Academy of Education (NAEd) became the recipient of the Henry Chauncey Award for Distinguished Service to Assessment and Educational Science by Educational Testing Service.

References

External links 
  Bio of Eva L. Baker on Social Research Methodology at UCLA website
 Events with Eva L. Baker, AERA President 2006-2007

Year of birth missing (living people)
Living people
University of California, Los Angeles alumni
UCLA Graduate School of Education and Information Studies faculty
UCLA Graduate School of Education and Information Studies alumni